1937 in professional wrestling describes the year's events in the world of professional wrestling.

List of notable promotions 
Only one promotion held notable shows in 1937.

Calendar of notable shows

Championship changes

EMLL

Debuts
Debut date uncertain:
Diablo Velazco
September 15  Gory Guerrero

Births
January 1:
Jack Reynolds (broadcaster) (died in 2008) 
Gashouse Gilbert (died in 2013) 
January 30  Frank Durso (died in 2018) 
February 13  Angelo Mosca (died in 2021)
February 26  Mark Lewin
March 9  Tor Kamata(died in 2007)
March 27  Kenny Jay (died in 2023) 
April 6  Peter Maivia(died in 1982)
April 7  Miguel Pérez (wrestler) (died in 2005) 
April 9  Terry Garvin(died in 1998)
April 13  Stan Stasiak(died in 1997) 
April 16  George Steele(died in 2017)
May 3  Erich Froelich (died in 2023) 
May 19  Pat Roach(died in 2004)
June 4  Gorilla Monsoon(died in 1999)
July 22  Hiro Matsuda(died in 1999)
August 3  Bull Ramos(died in 2006)
August 16  Uncle Elmer(died in 1992)
September 13  Danny Little Bear(died in 1991)
September 15  King Curtis Iaukea (died in 2010)
October 7  Butcher Vachon
November 26  Bob Babbitt (died in 2012)
December 12  Raúl Reyes
December 12  Buford Pusser (died in 1974)

Deaths
January 8  Farmer Burns (75)
December 22  Jake Kilrain (78)

References

 
professional wrestling